Sibylle was one of nine s built for the French Navy during the 1930s. She was sunk by Allied forces during Operation Torch, the invasion of French North Africa in 1942.

Design and description
The Diane-class submarines were improved versions of the earlier . They displaced  surfaced and  submerged.

For surface running, the boats were powered by two  diesel engines, each driving one propeller shaft. When submerged each propeller was driven by a  electric motor. They could reach  on the surface and  underwater.

The boats were armed with six  and a pair of  torpedo tubes. Three of the former were mounted in the bow internally, two were external amidships and one was external in the stern. The 40 cm tubes were aft and were also external; all of the external mounts could traverse. They carried a total of nine torpedoes. The Diane class were also armed with a single  deck gun.

Construction and career
The boat was launched on 28 January 1932. Sibylle was sunk by Allied forces off Casablanca on 8 November 1942.

Notes

References
 

World War II submarines of France
Ships built in France
1932 ships
Maritime incidents in November 1942
Diane-class submarine (1930)
World War II shipwrecks in the Mediterranean Sea